The New Labour Party  (Al Amal Al Jadeed) is a Salafist political party in Egypt.

References

Conservative parties in Egypt
Islamic political parties in Egypt
Political parties in Egypt
Political parties with year of establishment missing
Salafi groups
Sunni Islamic political parties